Free Music! is the second EP recording by rock band 50 Foot Wave, released in 2006 (see 2006 in music).

Track listing
all songs by Rob Ahlers, Bernard Georges and Kristin Hersh
"Hot Pink, Distorted" - 3:36
"Vena Cava" - 3:59
"Pretty Ugly" - 2:57
"Animal" - 3:08
"The Fuchsia Wall" - 2:33

Personnel
Kristin Hersh - vocals, guitars
Bernard Georges - bass
Rob Ahlers - drums, vocals

Production
Producer: Mudrock
Recorded and Mixed: Mudrock and ai fujisaki
Mastering: Joe Gastwirt at Gastwirt Mastering
Design: Lakuna, Inc.

50 Foot Wave albums
2006 EPs